Parliamentary elections were held in the Federated States of Micronesia on 4 March 1997, alongside a referendum on tax revenues. All candidates for seats in Congress ran as independents.

The referendum proposed modifying Chapter 5, Article IX of the constitution:

to increase the amount of tax revenue returned to the states from 50% to 80%. In order to pass, the change required the approval of at least 75% of voters in three of the four states. Although it was approved by a majority in two states and in terms of the total number of votes, the 75% approval threshold was not passed in any of the four states.

Results

Congress

Referendum

By state

References

Micronesia
1997 in the Federated States of Micronesia
Elections in the Federated States of Micronesia
Referendums in the Federated States of Micronesia
Non-partisan elections
Micronesia